Genidens planifrons is a species of catfish in the family Ariidae. It was described by Horacio Higuchi, Enir Girondi Reis and Francisco Gerson Araújo in 1982, originally under the genus Netuma. It migrates between the Lagoa dos Patos and the region of the Atlantic Ocean which it drains into.

References

Ariidae
Fish described in 1982